The Ministry of Housing, City and Territory is the national executive ministry of Colombia in charge of formulating, implementing, and orienting housing policy, urban planning, and water supply and sanitation services in the country.

References

 
Government agencies established in 2011
Water supply and sanitation in Colombia